Kevin "Al" Archer (born 21 December 1958) is an English guitarist and songwriter.

Career
Archer played with Kevin Rowland in the punk rock group the Killjoys. In 1978, Rowland and Archer formed Dexys Midnight Runners. Archer co-wrote some of the songs on the group's debut album Searching for the Young Soul Rebels.  

He used the name "Al" because Kevin Rowland decided that the group was not big enough to accommodate two Kevins. 
After the first album, Archer, exhausted by Dexys' touring schedule, left the group in early 1981. Archer has said he enjoyed the musical side of the group, but did not enjoy the culture of the band under Rowland's direction.

He then formed the Blue Ox Babes. The band finally signed to Go! Discs Records for three singles and an aborted album, Apples & Oranges, which belatedly saw release in 2009.

References

1958 births
Living people
musicians from Birmingham, West Midlands
English new wave musicians
English rock guitarists
English songwriters
Dexys Midnight Runners members